Louise's Garden is a 2008 Polish comedy film directed by Maciej Wojtyszko.

Cast 
 Patrycja Soliman - Luiza Bartodziej
 Marcin Dorociński - Fabian Sawicki 'Fabio'
 Kinga Preis - Anna Swiatek
 Krzysztof Stroiński - Lech Bartodziej
  - Orderly Marian
 Władysław Kowalski - Lawyer Frankowski 'Kaleka'
 Leslaw Zurek - Di Caprio
 Anna Lopatowska - Luiza's Mother
 Wiktoria Gorodecka - Prostitute Tatiana
  - Zygmunt Grudzien
 Witold Wieliński - Lawyer Jacek Grzelakowski

References

External links 

2007 comedy films
2007 films
Polish comedy films
2000s Polish-language films